Yponomeuta rorrella (willow ermine moth) is a lepidopteran from the family Yponomeutidae, the ermine moths, probably a migrant, but abundantly found in Britain, mostly concentrated in Northumberland.

Identification
The moths are about 19–24 mm in size and have greyish-silvery wings with black spots.

Host plant
The host plant of this moth is, among others, the European spindle. Other ermine moths that use this plant as their host are Yponomeuta plumbella and Yponomeuta cagnagella.

External links
 http://www.montgomeryshiremoths.org.uk
 http://www.suffolkmothgroup.org.uk

Moths described in 1796
Yponomeutidae
Moths of Europe